Soner Uysal (born 24 August 1977) is a football coach and a former player. Born in Germany, he represented Turkey at youth international level.

He had to retire at just 24 years of age due to chronic knee injury. In March 2018, he became assistant coach at Hamburger SV.

Honours 
Hamburger SV
 Bundesliga: third place 1999–2000

References

1977 births
Living people
People from Ludwigshafen
German people of Turkish descent
German footballers
Turkish footballers
Footballers from Rhineland-Palatinate
Association football forwards
Turkey under-21 international footballers
Bundesliga players
2. Bundesliga players
SV Waldhof Mannheim players
Hamburger SV players
Hamburger SV II players
Hamburger SV non-playing staff
FC Gütersloh 2000 players